Kit Kat is a chocolate-coated wafer confection.

Kit Kat, Kit Cat or Kitkat may also refer to:

Arts and entertainment
 Kit Kat Klub, a fictional place in the 1962 show Cabaret and 1972 film 
 Kit Kat, a fictional character in the 1991 film Hudson Hawk
 The Kit Kat, a 1991 Egyptian film
 Kit Kat band, the orchestra of Arthur Rosebery
 The Kit Kats, an American rock band

Businesses and organisations
 Kit-Cat Club, an early 18th-century English club in London with strong political and literary associations, whose name derives from "Kit Kats" mutton pies
 Kit Kat Club, a New York City cabaret venue, now Stephen Sondheim Theatre
 Kit Kat Club, a 1920s London nightclub, in the later Odeon Haymarket 
 KitKatClub, a Berlin night club opened in 1994
 Kit Kat Guest Ranch, a brothel in Nevada, US
 Kit-Kat Press, a printing press associated with the Oxford University Society of Bibliophiles
 Kit Kat Club, a New York City artists' club that inspired the Kokoon Arts Club

People
 Kitkat (comedian) (Soraya Ray L. Bañas, born 1987)
 Sidney Kitcat (1868–1942), English cricketer

Other uses
 Kit-cat portrait, a particular size of portrait 
 Android KitKat, version 4.4 of the popular mobile operating system
 Kit-Cat Klock, an art deco novelty-style clock 
 Al-Kit Kat, a neighborhood of Greater Cairo located in Giza, Egypt 
 Kit Kat, a station under Kit Kat Square on the Cairo Metro Line 3, Egypt

See also
 
 
 
 

 Kat (disambiguation)
 Kit (disambiguation)